John Kinloch , of Kirriemuir, was the first Chief Inspector of Constabulary for Scotland.

Notes

Scottish police officers
Chief Inspectors of Constabulary (Scotland)
People from Kirriemuir
Officers in Scottish police forces